In classical soil science, humus is the dark organic matter in soil that is formed by the decomposition of plant and animal matter. It is a kind of soil organic matter. It is rich in nutrients and retains moisture in the soil. Humus is the Latin word for "earth" or "ground".  

In agriculture, "humus" sometimes also is used to describe mature or natural compost extracted from a woodland or other spontaneous source for use as a soil conditioner. It is also used to describe a topsoil horizon that contains organic matter (humus type, humus form, or humus profile).

Humus has many nutrients that improve the health of soil, nitrogen being the most important. The ratio of carbon to nitrogen (C:N) of humus commonly ranges between eight and fifteen with the median being about twelve. It also significantly affects the bulk density of soil. Humus is amorphous and lacks the "cellular cake structure characteristic of plants, micro-organisms or animals".

Description

The primary material needed for the process of humification are plant materials. It is a material that belongs to the biosphere. The composition of humus varies dependent on the composition of the primary materials and the secondary microbial and animal products. The decomposition rate of the different compounds will affect the composition of the humus.

It is difficult to define humus precisely because it is a very complex substance which is not fully understood. Humus is different from decomposing soil organic matter. The latter looks rough and has visible remains of the original plant or animal matter. Fully humified humus, on the contrary, has a uniformly dark, spongy, and jelly-like appearance, and is amorphous; it may gradually decay over several years or persist for millennia. It has no determinate shape, structure, or quality. However, when examined under a microscope, humus may reveal tiny plant, animal, or microbial remains that have been mechanically, but not chemically, degraded. This suggests an ambiguous boundary between humus and soil organic matter. While distinct, humus is an integral part of soil organic matter.

There is little data available on the composition of forest humus because it is a complex mixture that is challenging for researchers to analyze. Researchers in the 1940s and 1960s tried using chemical separation to analyze plant and humic compounds in forest soil, but this proved impossible. Further research has been done in more recent years, though it remains an active field of study.

Humification
Microorganisms decompose a large portion of the soil organic matter into inorganic minerals that the roots of plants can absorb as nutrients. This process is termed "mineralization". In this process, nitrogen (nitrogen cycle) and the other nutrients (nutrient cycle) in the decomposed organic matter are recycled. Depending on the conditions in which the decomposition occurs, a fraction of the organic matter does not mineralize and instead is transformed by a process called "humification". Prior to modern analytical methods, early evidence led scientists to believe that humification resulted in concatenations of organic polymer resistant to the action of microorganisms, however recent research has demonstrated that microorganisms are capable of digesting humus.

Humification can occur naturally in soil or artificially in the production of compost. Organic matter is humified by a combination of saprotrophic fungi, bacteria, microbes and animals such as earthworms, nematodes, protozoa, and arthropods. Plant remains, including those that animals digested and excreted, contain organic compounds: sugars, starches, proteins, carbohydrates, lignins, waxes, resins, and organic acids. Decay in the soil begins with the decomposition of sugars and starches from carbohydrates, which decompose easily as detritivores initially invade the dead plant organs, while the remaining cellulose and lignin decompose more slowly. Simple proteins, organic acids, starches, and sugars decompose rapidly, while crude proteins, fats, waxes, and resins remain relatively unchanged for longer periods of time. Lignin, which is quickly transformed by white-rot fungi, is one of the primary precursors of humus, together with by-products of microbial and animal activity. The humus produced by humification is thus a mixture of compounds and complex biological chemicals of plant, animal, or microbial origin that has many functions and benefits in soil. Some judge earthworm humus (vermicompost) to be the optimal organic manure.

Stability
Much of the humus in most soils has persisted for more than 100 years, rather than having been decomposed into CO2, and can be regarded as stable; this organic matter has been protected from decomposition by microbial or enzyme action because it is hidden (occluded) inside small aggregates of soil particles, or tightly sorbed or complexed to clays.  Most humus that is not protected in this way is decomposed within 10 years and can be regarded as less stable or more labile. Stable humus contributes few plant-available nutrients in soil, but it helps maintain its physical structure. A very stable form of humus is formed from the slow oxidation (redox) of soil carbon after the incorporation of finely powdered charcoal into the topsoil. This process is speculated to have been important in the formation of the unusually fertile Amazonian . However, recent work suggests that complex soil organic molecules may be much less stable than previously thought: “the available evidence does not support the formation of large-molecular-size and persistent ‘humic substances’ in soils. Instead, soil organic matter is a continuum of progressively decomposing organic compounds.″

Horizons
Humus has a characteristic black or dark brown color and is organic due to an accumulation of organic carbon. Soil scientists use the capital letters O, A, B, C, and E to identify the master horizons, and lowercase letters for distinctions of these horizons. Most soils have three major horizons: the surface horizon (A), the subsoil (B), and the substratum (C). Some soils have an organic horizon (O) on the surface, but this horizon can also be buried. The master horizon (E) is used for subsurface horizons that have significantly lost minerals (eluviation). Bedrock, which is not soil, uses the letter R.

Benefits of soil organic matter and humus

The importance of chemically stable humus is thought by some to be the fertility it provides to soils in both a physical and chemical sense, though some agricultural experts put a greater focus on other features of it, such as its ability to suppress disease. It helps the soil retain moisture by increasing microporosity, and encourages the formation of good soil structure. The incorporation of oxygen into large organic molecular assemblages generates many active, negatively charged sites that bind to positively charged ions (cations) of plant nutrients, making them more available to the plant by way of ion exchange. Humus allows soil organisms to feed and reproduce, and is often described as the "life-force" of the soil. 

 The process that converts soil organic matter into humus feeds the population of microorganisms and other creatures in the soil, and thus maintains high and healthy levels of soil life.
 The rate at which soil organic matter is converted into humus promotes (when fast) or limits (when slow) the coexistence of plants, animals, and microorganisms in the soil.
 Effective humus and stable humus are additional sources of nutrients for microbes: the former provides a readily available supply and the latter acts as a long term storage reservoir.
 Decomposition of dead plant material causes complex organic compounds to be slowly oxidized (lignin-like humus) or to decompose into simpler forms (sugars and amino sugars, and aliphatic and phenolic organic acids), which are further transformed into microbial biomass (microbial humus) or reorganized, and further oxidized, into humic assemblages (fulvic acids and humic acids), which bind to clay minerals and metal hydroxides. The ability of plants to absorb humic substances with their roots and metabolize them has been long debated. There is now a consensus that humus functions hormonally rather than simply nutritionally in plant physiology.
 Humus is a colloidal substance and increases the cation-exchange capacity of soil, hence its ability to store nutrients by chelation. While these nutrient cations are available to plants, they are held in the soil and prevented from being leached by rain or irrigation.
 Humus can hold the equivalent of 80–90% of its weight in moisture, and therefore increases the soil's capacity to withstand drought.
 The biochemical structure of humus enables it to moderate, i.e. buffer, excessive acidic or alkaline soil conditions.
 During humification, microbes secrete sticky, gum-like mucilages; these contribute to the crumby structure (tilth) of the soil by adhering particles together and allowing greater aeration of the soil. Toxic substances such as heavy metals and excess nutrients can be chelated, i.e., bound to the organic molecules of humus, and so prevented from leaching away.
 The dark, usually brown or black, color of humus helps to warm cold soils in spring.
Humus can contribute to climate change mitigation through its carbon sequestration potential. Artificial humic acid and artificial fulvic acid synthesized from agricultural litter, can increase the content of dissolved organic matter and total organic carbon in soil.

See also

Biochar
Biomass
Biotic material
Detritus
Glomalin
Humic acid
Immobilization (soil science)
Mineralization (soil science)
Mycorrhizal fungi and soil carbon storage
Organic matter
Plant litter
Soil horizon
Soil science
Terra preta

References

External links

Composting
Soil improvers
Soil science
Organic farming